Crotta O'Neill's are a hurling club in the Kilflynn area of County Kerry, Ireland. The club is named after Maurice O'Neill, an Irish Republican. They play in the Kerry Senior Hurling Championship. The club is primarily concerned with the game of hurling. Their pitch is located in Dromakee.

Roll of Honour
 Kerry Senior Hurling Championship (9): 1939, 1941, 1943, 1944, 1945, 1947, 1950, 1951, 1968
 Kerry Minor Hurling Championship (3): 2016, 2017, 2019
 Kerry Under-21 hurling championship (4): 1992, 2012 (with Abbeydorney), 2018, 2022

County Championship Winning Captains

 1939: Jimmy Flaherty
 1941: Jack Kenney
 1943: Pat Ladie
 1944: Jimmy Flaherty
 1945: Jimmy Flaherty
 1947: Jimmy Flaherty
 1950: Jimmy Flaherty
 1951: Tom Nolan
 1968: Tom Kenny

Notable players

 Dick Spring
 Todd Nolan
 Shane Nolan

References

External links
Official Crotta O'Neill's GAA Club website

Gaelic games clubs in County Kerry
Hurling clubs in County Kerry